Tofurkey  (a portmanteau of tofu and turkey) is a plant-based meat substitute patterned after turkey, in the form of a loaf of vegetarian protein, usually made from tofu (soybean protein) or seitan (wheat protein) with a stuffing made from grains or bread, flavored with a broth and seasoned with herbs and spices. It is often served at a vegetarian or vegan Thanksgiving meal.

Ready-made products
UnTurkey, produced until 2006 by the now-defunct Now & Zen Bakery in San Francisco, was one of the first ready-made tofurkey products available in the U.S.

Currently available products include those of Tofurky, the Celebration Roast produced by Field Roast and the Stuffed Holiday Roast made by Match Foods (previously called AuraPro).

See also

 List of casserole dishes
 List of meat substitutes
 List of stuffed dishes
 Meat analogue
 Nut roast, an often homemade, nut-based, roasted main dish
  Quorn
 Stuffed peppers, a dish of stuffed vegetables
 Veggie burger

References

External links

 Unturkey.org hosts and archives the original UnTurkey recipe from the Now & Zen cookbook

Meat substitutes
Stuffed dishes